Rickie Lee Skaggs (born July 18, 1954), known professionally as Ricky Skaggs, is an American neotraditional country and bluegrass singer, musician, producer, and composer. He primarily plays mandolin; however, he also plays fiddle, guitar, mandocaster, and banjo.

Skaggs was inducted into the Musicians Hall of Fame and Museum in 2016 and the Country Music Hall of Fame in 2018. On January 13, 2021, it was announced Skaggs had been awarded the National Medal of Arts by President Donald Trump, alongside fellow country musician Toby Keith.

Biography

Early career
Skaggs was born in Cordell, Kentucky. He started playing music at age 5 after he was given a mandolin by his father, Hobert Skaggs. At age 6, he played mandolin and sang on stage with Bill Monroe. At age 7, he appeared on television's Martha White country music variety show, playing with Lester Flatt and Earl Scruggs. He also wanted to audition for the Grand Ole Opry at that time, but was told he was too young.

In his mid-teens, Skaggs met a fellow teen guitarist, Keith Whitley, and the two started playing together with Whitley's banjo playing brother, Dwight, on radio shows. By 1970, they had earned a spot opening for Ralph Stanley, and Skaggs and Keith Whitley were thereafter invited to join Stanley's band, the Clinch Mountain Boys.

Skaggs later joined The Country Gentlemen in Washington, DC, J. D. Crowe's New South. In 1976, Skaggs formed progressive bluegrass band Boone Creek, including members Vince Gill and Jerry Douglas. For a few years, Skaggs was a member of Emmylou Harris's Hot Band. He wrote the arrangements for Harris's 1980 bluegrass-roots album, Roses in the Snow. In addition to arranging for Harris, Skaggs sang harmony and played mandolin and fiddle in the Hot Band.

Country career
Skaggs launched his own career in 1980, achieving 12 No. 1 hits, 8 CMA awards, and 8 ACM awards. In 1982, he became a member of the Grand Ole Opry, the youngest musician ever to be inducted at that time. Guitarist and producer Chet Atkins credited Skaggs with "single-handedly" saving country music. Skaggs is considered one of the pioneers of the Neotraditional country sub-genre.

In 1981, he debuted on Epic Records with the album Waitin for the Sun to Shine, which brought him to both the country and pop charts and produced two No. 1 hits.

In 1982, he released Highways & Heartaches, his only platinum album, featuring the instrumental heavy "Highway 40 Blues".

Keeping with his instrumental heavy themes, he released "Country Boy" on the album of the same name. He also had Bill Monroe as a guest on this album.

Exploring a role as producer, Skaggs produced Dolly Parton's album White Limozeen, which started her comeback in country music.

Skaggs also guested on other albums. In 1995, he sang with Vince Gill on "Go Rest High on That Mountain", which later won CMA's Song of the Year and was determined by BMI to be the Most-Performed Song in 1997.

Later career

In 1996, Skaggs went back to his bluegrass roots, and also experimented with new sounds. With his band, Kentucky Thunder, he is a perennial winner of Grammy Awards and International Bluegrass Music Association for best bluegrass album.

In 2000, he shared the stage with Vermont-based jam band, Phish. On March 20, 2007, Skaggs released an album with rock musician Bruce Hornsby.

In 2008, Skaggs released an album he recorded with The Whites on his Skaggs Family Records label.

In 2008, Skaggs recorded a bluegrass version of "Old Enough" by the Raconteurs with Ashley Monroe and the Raconteurs. He played the mandolin on the track as well as sharing vocals with Jack White, Brendan Benson, and Ashley Monroe.

In 2011, Skaggs, along with other musicians including the Irish band The Brock McGuire Band, released their album 'Green Grass Blue Grass", an exploration of the connection between Irish Traditional Music and American Bluegrass and Appalachian music.

Also in 2011, Skaggs contributed to Moody Bluegrass TWO...Much Love, a bluegrass tribute album to the British Progressive Rock band the Moody Blues. Skaggs sang lead vocal on the song "You And Me".

In 2012, Skaggs collaborated with Barry Gibb on the song, "Soldier's Son" which was released on Music to My Ears.

In 2015, Skaggs toured with Ry Cooder, Sharon White and other members of The Whites.

In 2016, he produced the Grammy-winning album Love Remains for Lady Antebellum member Hillary Scott.

In 2019, he collaborated with Steven Curtis Chapman for Chapman's album Deeper Roots: Where the Bluegrass Grows

In 2019, Skaggs performed at the 6th Musicians Hall of Fame and Museum Concert and Induction Ceremony. 

As of recent years, Skaggs continues performing at the historic Grand Ole Opry house in Nashville, Tennessee.

In 2021 Skaggs was nominated for the SOTE award which was delayed by the Covid pandemic.

Personal life
Ricky Skaggs was previously married to Brenda Stanley and has two children, Andrew and Mandy, from that relationship. Skaggs has been married to Sharon White of The Whites since August 1981. They have 2 children; a daughter, Molly, and a son, Lucas. Molly Skaggs is a Christian/Gospel singer.

In June 2020, Skaggs underwent quadruple bypass surgery in Nashville.

Skaggs in 2021 was awarded the National Medal of the Arts by President Donald Trump.

Discography

Awards

Grammy Awards
 1983 Best Country Instrumental Performance: New South (J.D. Crowe, Jerry Douglas, Todd Phillips, Tony Rice, Ricky Skaggs) for Fireball
 1984 Best Country Instrumental Performance: Ricky Skaggs for Wheel Hoss
 1986 Best Country Instrumental Performance (Orchestra, Group or Soloist): Ricky Skaggs for Raisin' The Dickins
 1991 Best Country Vocal Collaboration: Ricky Skaggs, Steve Wariner & Vince Gill for Restless
 1998 Best Bluegrass Album: Ricky Skaggs and Kentucky Thunder for Bluegrass Rules!
 1998 Best Country Collaboration with Vocals: Clint Black, Joe Diffie, Merle Haggard, Emmylou Harris, Alison Krauss, Patty Loveless, Earl Scruggs, Ricky Skaggs, Marty Stuart, Pam Tillis, Randy Travis, Travis Tritt & Dwight Yoakam for Same Old Train
 1999 Best Bluegrass Album: Ricky Skaggs and Kentucky Thunder for Ancient Tones
 2000 Best Southern, Country, or Bluegrass Gospel Album: Ricky Skaggs and Kentucky Thunder for Soldier Of The Cross
 2003 Best Country Performance By A Duo or Group With Vocal: Ricky Skaggs and Kentucky Thunder for A Simple Life
 2004 Best Bluegrass Album: Ricky Skaggs and Kentucky Thunder for Brand New Strings
 2005 Best Musical Album For Children, "Songs From The Neighborhood, The Music Of Mr. Rogers"
 2006 Best Bluegrass Album: Ricky Skaggs and Kentucky Thunder for Instrumentals
 2008 Best Southern, Country, or Bluegrass Gospel Album: Ricky Skaggs and The Whites for Salt of the Earth
 2009 Best Bluegrass Album Honoring The Fathers Of Bluegrass 1946 & 47
 2016 Best Contemporary Christian Music Album (as producer for Love Remains by Hillary Scott & The Scott Family )

CMA (Country Music Association) Awards
 1982 Male Vocalist of the Year: Ricky Skaggs
 1982 Horizon Award: Ricky Skaggs
 1983 Instrumental Group of the Year: Ricky Skaggs Band
 1984 Instrumental Group of the Year: Ricky Skaggs Band
 1985 Entertainer of the Year: Ricky Skaggs
 1985 Instrumental Group of the Year: Ricky Skaggs Band
 1987 Vocal Duo of the Year: Ricky Skaggs & Sharon White
 1991 Vocal Event of the Year (with Mark O'Connor & New Nashville Cats)

ACM (Academy of Country Music) Awards
 1981 Top New Male Vocalist of the Year: Ricky Skaggs
 1982 Band of the Year – Touring: Ricky Skaggs Band
 1983 Band of the Year – Touring: Ricky Skaggs Band
 1984 Band of the Year – Touring: Ricky Skaggs Band
 1984 Specialty Instrument: Ricky Skaggs (Mandolin)
 1985 Band of the Year – Touring: Ricky Skaggs Band
 1986 Band of the Year – Touring: Ricky Skaggs Band
 1987 Specialty Instrument: Ricky Skaggs

IBMA (International Bluegrass Music Association) Awards
 1998 Instrumental Group of the Year: Ricky Skaggs & Kentucky Thunder
 1998 Album Of The Year: Ricky Skaggs & Kentucky Thunder for Bluegrass Rules!
 1999 Instrumental Group Of The Year: Ricky Skaggs & Kentucky Thunder
 2000 Instrumental Group Of The Year: Ricky Skaggs & Kentucky Thunder
 2000 Instrumental Album Of The Year: David Grisman, Ronnie McCoury, Sam Bush, Frank Wakefield, Bobby Osborne, Jesse McReynolds, Ricky Skaggs & Buck White for Bluegrass Mandolin Extravaganza
 2000 Recorded Event of the Year: David Grisman, Ronnie McCoury, Frank Wakefield, Sam Bush, Bobby Osborne, Jesse McReynolds, Ricky Skaggs & Buck White for Bluegrass Mandolin Extravaganza
 2002 Instrumental Group Of The Year: Ricky Skaggs & Kentucky Thunder
 2003 Instrumental Group Of The Year: Ricky Skaggs & Kentucky Thunder
 2004 Instrumental Group Of The Year: Ricky Skaggs & Kentucky Thunder
 2005 Instrumental Group Of The Year: Ricky Skaggs & Kentucky Thunder
 2006 Instrumental Group Of The Year: Ricky Skaggs & Kentucky Thunder
 2008 Recorded Event of the Year: Everett Lilly & Everybody and Their Brother; Featuring Everett Lilly, Bea Lilly, Charles Lilly, Daniel Lilly, Mark Lilly, Marty Stuart, Rhonda Vincent, Billy Walker, Ronnie McCoury, Rob McCoury, David Ball, Charlie Cushman, Larry Stephenson, Joe Spivey, Eddie Stubbs, Jason Carter, Dickey Lee, Freddy Weller, Mike Bub, Rad Lewis, Andy May, Darrin Vincent, Marcia Campbell, Clay Rigdon, Eric Blankenship and Bill Wolfenbarger (artists); Charles Lilly & Bill Wolfenbarger (producers); Swift River Music
 2012 Gospel Recorded Performance of the Year: "Singing as We Rise", Gibson Brothers with Ricky Skaggs
 2017 Gospel Recorded Performance of the Year for song "Sacred Memories", Joe Mullins & the Radio Ramblers with Ricky Skaggs and Sharon White Skaggs  
 2018 International Bluegrass Music Hall of Fame inductee

TNN/Music City News Country Awards
 1982 Bluegrass Act of the Year
 1983 Bluegrass Act of the Year 
 1983 Star of Tomorrow
 1984 Bluegrass Act of the Year
 1988 Instrumentalist of the Year
 1989 Instrumentalist of the Year
 1990 Instrumentalist of the Year
 1996 Vocal Collaboration of the Year (with Vince Gill & Patty Loveless)

Other awards and accomplishments
 National Medal of Arts, awarded by President Donald Trump in 2021
 Inducted into the Country Music Hall of Fame on March 27, 2018, in the Modern Era category
 R&R Best New Artist
 Billboard magazine's Artist of the Year
 Musician Magazine- Voted One of the Top 100 Guitarists of the Century
 Artist of the Decade- Listeners' Poll Award BBC Radio 2
 CMT's 40 Greatest Men of Country Music rank No. 37 in 2003.
 Judge for the 2nd annual Independent Music Awards
 ACM's Cliffie Stone Pioneer Award, 2012
 Gospel Music Hall of Fame inductee, 2012
 Bluegrass Star Award, presented by the Bluegrass Heritage Foundation of Dallas, Texas (2017).
 Honorary Doctorate of Humanities from Eastern Kentucky University – 2005 
 Honorary Doctorate of Music from Berklee College of Music – received in March 2008
 Plaque on Nashville's StarWalk, 1987

References

External links
 
 1997 Interview with Ricky Skaggs
 Ricky Skaggs Biography
 Interview with Ricky Skaggs NAMM Oral History Library (2010)
 

1954 births
20th-century American guitarists
20th-century American singers
21st-century American singers
American bluegrass mandolinists
American country guitarists
American country singer-songwriters
American male guitarists
American male singer-songwriters
American mandolinists
American multi-instrumentalists
Bluegrass musicians from Kentucky
Country Music Hall of Fame inductees
Country musicians from Kentucky
Epic Records artists
Grammy Award winners
Grand Ole Opry members
Guitarists from Kentucky
Kentucky Thunder members
Living people
Musicians from Appalachia
New South (band) members
People from Lawrence County, Kentucky
Rebel Records artists
Rounder Records artists
Songwriters from Kentucky
The Country Gentlemen members
United States National Medal of Arts recipients